Outaouais (also commonly called The Outaouais) is a region of western Quebec, Canada. It includes the city of Gatineau, the municipality of Val-des-Monts, the municipality of Cantley and the Papineau region. Geographically, it is located on the north side of the Ottawa River opposite Canada's capital, Ottawa.

From 2016 to 2020, the Outaouais has a lower per capita disposable income than the rest of Quebec.

It was $31,055 in 2020, compared to $33,093 in Quebec overall.

In 2020, the unfavourable margin grew to 6.2%.

History 
The name of the region comes from the French name for the Ottawa River, which in turn comes from the French name for the Indigenous Odawa that lived near the region.  Prior to European arrival in the region, the areas along the Ottawa River were commonly used by various tribes to trade and gather.

The oldest European settlement in the region is Hull (now a neighbourhood of Gatineau) which was founded in 1800 by Philemon Wright as Wright's Town.  The settlement quickly became involved in the lumber trade, which continued along the Ottawa River until the late 20th century.  None of the original town buildings remain today, as they were destroyed in the 1900 Hull–Ottawa fire.  Hull remained a city until 2002, when it was merged with several neighboring cities to form the current city of Gatineau.

Demography 

For the next few years, the Outaouais is predicted to enjoy continuous demographic increase.

From 2021 to 2026, the region's population is predicted to expand faster than the rest of Quebec (+4.8% against +4.2%).

Longer-term projections show that the region's population will expand faster than Quebec's for each following five-year period.

Year after year, the Outaouais' net migration (inflows minus outflows) with other areas is positive.

Yet, for the first time in 20 years, the area had negative net migration in 2020-2021.

Historically, the Outaouais area averaged positive inter-regional migration balances, gaining 541 residents each year for a net rate of +0.14% from 2016 to 2021.

Interregional migration rate

 2016-2017 : 0,16 %
 2017-2018 : 0,25 %
 2018-2019 : 0,19 %
 2019-2020 : 0,12 %
 2020-2021 : -0,01 %

Economy 
In 2021, the situation on the Outaouais labour market has improved. Employment increased by 9,500 positions.

The participation rate increased to 63.7%. The negative gap between the region's participation rate and that of Quebec narrowed from 1.0 to 0.4 percentage points.

The employment rate increased to 60.2% in the region. The region now has an employment rate comparable to that of Quebec (60.1%).

Since 1999, the Outaouais has generally had a lower unemployment rate than Quebec as a whole. In 2021, this trend continued; the unemployment rate decreased by 2.5 percentage points to 5.6%, compared to 6.1% for Quebec as a whole. This decrease is explained by the improvement in employment.

The Outaouais' industrial structure matches its mission, which is concentrated on government services. As a result, the economy is heavily geared towards the service sector.

In 2021, the primary sector in the Outaouais accounted for a lower proportion of jobs than the primary sector in Quebec as a whole (1.4% vs. 2.2%).

Also, the manufacturing sector employed less people than the rest of Quebec (4.0% vs. 11.3%).

Nonetheless, the construction sector employed more people in the Outaouais (8.4%) than in Quebec overall (6.7%).

The region's economy is dominated by tertiarization. The tertiary sector's percentage of total employment (86.1%) is substantially larger than that reported in Quebec overall (79.7%). This finding is explained by the significance of public services.

In 2021, the Outaouais would account for 4.7% of Quebec's population and 4.6% of its jobs.

Administrative divisions

Regional county municipalities

First Nations Reserves
 Kitigan Zibi
 Rapid Lake

Major communities
Cantley
Chelsea
Déléage
Gatineau
Gracefield
L'Ange-Gardien
La PêcheManiwaki
Mansfield-et-Pontefract
Papineauville
Pontiac
Saint-André-Avellin
Thurso
Val-des-Monts

School districts

Francophone
 Centre de services scolaire au Cœur-des-Vallées
 Centre de services scolaire des Draveurs
 Centre de services scolaire des Hauts-Bois-de-l'Outaouais
 Centre de services scolaire des Portages-de-l'Outaouais

Anglophone
 Western Québec School Board

References

External links

Portail régional de l'Outaouais Official website 
Répertoire des clubs de golf de la région de l'Outaouais 

 
Canada geography articles needing translation from French Wikipedia
Administrative regions of Quebec